Thomaston is a village in eastern Great Neck in the Town of North Hempstead in Nassau County, on the North Shore of Long Island, in New York, United States. The population was 2,617 at the 2010 census.

History 
Thomaston officially became a village on October 1, 1931, after the majority of residents voted in favor of incorporation to preserve home rule. Originally, the incorporation proposal included University Gardens and Russell Gardens. However, University Gardens chose not to be included in the proposal and Russell Gardens decided to incorporate itself separately around that time.

The founders of the Incorporated Village of Thomaston were John W. Weight, Hunter L. DeLatour, Ernest A. Gallagher, and Henry A. Singley.

Thomaston Village Hall was constructed in 1971 in order to provide for more efficient government operations and a permanent home for Thomaston's government. It was designed by the Great Neck-based architectural firm of Blum & Nerzig.

Prior to Village Hall's construction, meetings were typically held in the nearby firehouse and village records were stored in the homes of the Village Clerks.

Thomaston's name 
The name Thomaston has been used to describe the area since the middle part of the 19th Century. William R. Grace, a prominent local who would eventually become the Mayor of New York City, acquired a large area of land around the Long Island Rail Road's Great Neck station; the land he acquired included all of present-day Great Neck Plaza. Grace named the area Thomaston after the ancestral home of his wife, Lillian Gilchrist, located in Maine.

At some point, that area's name was changed to Great Neck Plaza, which would ultimately stick and become the name that village incorporated under in 1930.

When the area now known as Thomaston decided to incorporate itself as a village the next year, the residents chose to use this name for their new village since members of the Grace family continued to own land in the area.

Geography 

Demographics

As of the census of 2000, there were 2,607 people, 973 households, and 724 families residing in the village. The population density was 6,247.9 people per square mile (2,396.6/km2). There were 1,000 housing units at an average density of 2,396.6 per square mile (919.3/km2). The racial makeup of the village was 81.09% White, 0.84% African American, 0.04% Native American, 13.69% Asian, 0.23% Pacific Islander, 2.38% from other races, and 1.73% from two or more races. Hispanic or Latino of any race were 7.94% of the population.

There were 973 households, out of which 34.3% had children under the age of 18 living with them, 65.1% were married couples living together, 6.9% had a female householder with no husband present, and 25.5% were non-families. 21.5% of all households were made up of individuals, and 11.0% had someone living alone who was 65 years of age or older. The average household size was 2.67 and the average family size was 3.12.

In the village, the population was spread out, with 23.4% under the age of 18, 4.6% from 18 to 24, 27.2% from 25 to 44, 27.4% from 45 to 64, and 17.3% who were 65 years of age or older. The median age was 42 years. For every 100 females, there were 91.7 males. For every 100 females age 18 and over, there were 89.0 males.

The median income for a household in the village was $92,706, and the median income for a family was $110,502. Males had a median income of $72,656 versus $49,474 for females. The per capita income for the village was $44,760. About 2.7% of families and 4.4% of the population were below the poverty line, including 2.3% of those under age 18 and 6.8% of those age 65 or over.

Government

Village government 
As of September 2021, the Mayor of Thomaston is Steven Weinberg, the Deputy Mayor is James Sharkey, and the Village Trustees are Jill S. Monoson, To-On Pang, James Sharkey, and Burton Weston.

Representation in higher government

Town representation 
Thomaston is located in the Town of North Hempstead's 4th district, which as of September 2021 is represented on the Town Board by Veronica Lurvey (D–Great Neck).

Nassau County representation 
Thomaston is located in Nassau County's 10th Legislative district, which as of January 2023 is represented in the Nassau County Legislature by Mazi Melesa Pilip (R–Great Neck).

New York State representation

New York State Assembly 
Thomaston is located in the New York State Assembly's 16th Assembly district, which as of July 2021 is represented by Gina Sillitti (D–Manorhaven).

New York State Senate 
Thomaston is located in the New York State Senate's 7th State Senate district, which as of July 2021 is represented in the New York State Senate by Anna Kaplan (D–North Hills).

Federal representation

United States Congress 
Thomaston is located in New York's 3rd congressional district, which as of July 2021 is represented in the United States Congress by Tom Suozzi (D–Glen Cove).

United States Senate 
Like the rest of New York, Thomaston is represented in the United States Senate by Charles Schumer (D) and Kirsten Gillibrand (D).

Politics 
In the 2016 U.S. presidential election, the majority of Thomaston voters voted for Hillary Clinton (D).

Education

School districts 
The majority of Thomaston is located within the boundaries of (and is thus served by) the Great Neck Union Free School District, although a small part of the village's northeastern corner is located within the Manhasset Union Free School District (though all homes are in the Great Neck part of Thomaston). As such, all children who reside within Thomaston and attend public schools go to Great Neck's schools.

Library districts 
The majority of Thomaston is located within the boundaries of (and is thus served by) the Great Neck Library District, although a small part of the village's northeastern corner is located within the Manhasset Library District (though all homes are in the Great Neck part of Thomaston). The boundaries of both library districts within the village roughly correspond with those of the two school districts

Infrastructure

Transportation

Road 
One state-owned road travels through Thomaston: Northern Boulevard (NY 25A); Northern Boulevard forms the southern boundary of Thomaston.

Other major roads within the village include Colonial Road, East Shore Road, Grace Avenue, and Shoreward Drive. A small portion of Middle Neck Road also passes through the village.

Rail 
Although the Long Island Rail Road's Port Washington Branch passes through the village, there are no stations located within the village. The nearest Long Island Rail Road station to the village is Great Neck.

Part of the LIRR's Manhasset Viaduct is located within the village's boundaries.

Bus 
Thomaston is served by the n20G, n20H, n21, n25, n26, and n57 bus routes, which are operated by Nassau Inter-County Express (NICE). All of these bus routes (excluding the n57) travel through the area via Northern Boulevard and Middle Neck Road.

The n57 bus route briefly passes through the village via. Gilchrest Road and Grace Avenue.

Utilities

Natural gas 
National Grid USA provides natural gas to homes and businesses that are hooked up to natural gas lines in Thomaston.

Power 
PSEG Long Island provides power to all homes and businesses within Thomaston. Additionally, PSEG's Port Washington to Great Neck Overhead Transmission Line passes through the village.

Sewage 
Thomaston is connected to sanitary sewers. The eastern portions of the village are within the boundaries of (and are thus served by) the Great Neck Water Pollution Control District. The small portion of the village west of Middle Neck Road is within the boundaries of (and is thus served by) the Belgrave Sewer District.

Water 
Thomaston is primarily located within the boundaries of the Manhasset–Lakeville Water District, which provides the majority of Thomaston with water. However, some areas of the village north of the Long Island Rail Road's trancks are within the boundaries of (and are thus served by) the Water Authority of Great Neck North.

Additionally, the Manhasset–Lakeville Water District owns and operates a water tower within the village, known as the Thomaston Tank.

Notable person

 Thomas P. DiNapoli – Comptroller of the State of New York, former New York State Assemblyman, and a former Democratic candidate for Nassau County Executive.

References

External links 

 Official website

Great Neck Peninsula
Villages in New York (state)
Town of North Hempstead, New York
Villages in Nassau County, New York